Stina Wirsén Hedengren is a Swedish author and illustrator, born 1968 in Älvsjö, a suburb of Stockholm, Sweden. Wirsén, educated at Konstfack in Stockholm 1985–1992, was the in-house illustrator at
Dagens Nyheter between 1990 and 2010. During this period she was the head of the papers illustration department for several years. After 2010 she began working as a freelance illustrator and author.
Over the years she has received several awards for her illustrations.
With her illustrations, Stina Wirsén often switches between different genres. That also applies to
her children's books; they vary in target group, genre, style and method, such as ABC-books for the youngest age group, as well as anthologies, text, and picture books.
She is married to Swedish graphic designer and art director Pompe Hedengren.

Selected assignments 

 Since 2000 Stina Wirsén holds lectures and workshops internationally. Her focus is on children between the ages of 2–6 years. She has been working with children and pictures/images in for instance Abu Dhabi, Tokyo, Bologna, Umeå, Stockholm etc.
 Åhléns City – A 25-meter wide, hand drawn, fashion illustration for the beauty section at the department store in central Stockholm. The illustration was drawn straight on to the Swedish handmade tiles at the tile factory in Askersund.
 Stamps for the Swedish Post Office – A series of 8 stamps picturing creations by different Swedish fashion designers.
 UN Human Rights – A series of graphic illustrations of UN's Human Rights applied on 14 miljon copies of the Swedish telephone directory. The series was also exhibited at the UN headquarters in New York during the 50-year anniversary of the Human Rights.
 Save the Children, Sweden – both non-profit and commissioned work, e.g. illustrations to articles in their quarterly magazine BARN (CHILDREN).
 Google "doodle" illustration on the theme diversity published/applied on Google first page worldwide on the Swedish National Day 2015.

Selected exhibitions 
 Sven-Harrys konstmuseum 2014 – Around the turn of this millennium there was an explosive progress on the Swedish fashion scene. The exhibition "Svenskt Mode: 2000 – 2015” at Sven-Harrys Konstmuseum in Stockholm depicts the fast, esthetic and conceptual change during this eventful period of time with a big collection of key garments from Swedish fashion designers and fashion illustrations by Stina Wirsén and Liselotte Watkins.
 Bror Hjorts Hus 2013 – Solo exhibition with the main focus on illustrations from children's books, but also several fashion- and portrait illustration.
 Svenska Ambassaden i Tokyo 2012 – A big Swedish design exhibition during Tokyo Design Week. A collaboration between the Swedish Institute, Svensk Form and the Swedish Embassy in Tokyo.
 Nationalmuseum 2010 – The exhibition "Handgjort" (hand made). An exhibition with focus on the hand drawn line. A dialog between Stina Wirsén's illustrations and illustrations from the Swedish National Galley's own collection, for instance work by Rafaell, Angelica Kauffmann, John Bauer, Antoine Watteau and Matthias Grünewald.
 Konstnärshuset 2009 – Solo exhibition of reportage illustrations from Stockholm's bar- and restaurant life.
 Dunkers Kulturhus 2015 – Picture book and fashion sketches in connection with Swedish fashion designer Bea Szenfeld's solo exhibition.

Selected books 
(Author Stina Wirsén unless otherwise stated)
 Jag har fått en klocka! 1991
 Sakboken 1995
 Djurboken 1995
 Liten och stor 1995
 Tussas Kalas 1996 (author Martin Vårdstedt and Anna Hörling)
 Siffror och Nuffror 1997 (author Anna Hörling)
 Hedvig! (author Frida Nilsson)
 Hedvig och sommaren med steken (author Frida Nilsson)
 Hedvig och Hardemos prinsessa (author Frida Nilsson)
 Hallå därinne! 2010 (author Ulf Stark)
 En stjärna vid namn Ajax (author Ulf Stark)
 Systern från havet (author Ulf Stark)
 Full cirkus på Sockerbullen 2012 (together with Carin Wirsén)
 Jag 2012
 Liten – a book about children's vulnerability and the responsibility of the grownups. Commissioned by the Swedish Crime Victim Compensation and Support Authority (Brottsoffermyndigheten) 2015

Children's book series – Rut och Knut 
(author Carin Wirsén)

 Rut och Knut lagar mat
 Rut och Knut ställer ut
 Rut och Knut gräver ut
 Rut och Knut klär ut sig
 Rut och Knut börjar träna
 Rut och Knut och lilla Tjut
 ABC med Rut och Knut
 Lilla ABC med Rut och Knut
 Supershow med Rut och Knut

Children's book series – Vem? 
 Vems byxor? 2005
 Vem är arg? 2005
 Vem bestämmer? 2006
 Vem blöder? 2006
 Vems mormor? 2007
 Vem är ensam? 2007
 Vem är söt? 2008
 Vem är borta? 2008
 Vem är bäst? 2009
 Vem sover inte? 2009
 Vem är död? 2010
 Vems kompis? 2010
 Vems bebis? 2011
 Vem städar inte? 2011
 Vem kommer nu? 2012
 Vem är sjuk? 2012
 Vem är var? 2012
 Vems hus? 2015
 Vem är stor? 2016
 Vems syskon? 2016

The "Vem?" books were made into an animated series in 2010 and are regularly broadcast on Sveriges Television.

Children's book series – Brokiga 
 En liten skär och många små brokiga (author Carin Wirsén)
 Dela! 2013
 Titta! 2014
 Bygga! 2014
 Nej! 2015
 Rita! 2015
 En liten skär och alla bråkiga brokiga (author Carin Wirsén, Anna Hörling and Stina Wirsén)

Selected awards 

 The Society of Newspaper Design 1997
 The Society of Scandinavian Illustrators 2001
 Stockholms Stads Kulturpris
 Nordiska Tecknares Pris – Guld, Silver
 Award of Excellence by Society of Newspaper Design
 Elsa Beskow-plaketten 2000 for "Rut och Knut ställer ut”
 Expressens Heffaklump 2007 for "Supershow med Rut och Knut”
 Kolla! Svenska Tecknares Pris

References

External links
 Stina Wirsén website
 Brokiga website
 Japanese Brokiga website

1968 births
Living people
Swedish women illustrators
Swedish children's book illustrators
Swedish illustrators
Swedish women artists
Swedish women writers
Artists from Stockholm
Writers from Stockholm